The 1990 United States Senate election in Maine was held on November 6, 1990. Incumbent Republican U.S. Senator William Cohen won re-election to a third term.

Major candidates

Democratic 
 Neil Rolde, State Representative

Republican 
 William Cohen, incumbent U.S. Senator

Results

See also 
 1990 United States Senate elections

References 

1990 Maine elections
Maine
1990